Bheemunipatnam mandal is one of the 46 mandals in Visakhapatnam District. It is under the administration of Visakhapatnam revenue division and the headquarters is located at Bheemunipatnam. The Mandal is bounded by Padmanabham, Anandapuram mandals in Visakhapatnam District and Bhogapuram mandal in Vizianagaram District. It is a major Suburb and got merged in Greater Visakhapatnam Municipal Corporation. Organisations like INS Kalinga is located in this area.

Towns and villages 

 census, Kapuluppada is the most populated and Ramayogi Agraharam is the least populated settlement in the mandal. The mandal consists of 26 settlements. It includes 1 town and 25 villages. Bheemunipatnam municipality was merged with Greater Visakhapatnam Municipal Corporation.

The settlements in the mandal are listed below:

Note: †–Mandal headquarter

See also 
 List of mandals in Andhra Pradesh

References

Mandals in Visakhapatnam district